The Ashtabula Harbour Commercial District is a historic district in the northern section of the city of Ashtabula, Ohio, United States.  Comprising a commercial section near the city's Lake Erie waterfront, the district includes buildings constructed largely in the late nineteenth century, at which time Ashtabula was a flourishing port city.

Most of the buildings in the district were constructed between 1865 and 1878, although occasional buildings were erected in the early 1900s.  The district's area has long been commercial; from its earliest years, the street running through the district was known as Bridge Street, because it terminates at a bridge spanning the Ashtabula River.  Until it became part of the city of Ashtabula in the 1870s, Ashtabula Harbour was a separate municipality (it lies two miles north of the city's downtown), and Bridge Street its commercial sector.  The area's buildings vary greatly in appearance, with some surpassing others by several feet.  Designs include examples of the Italianate, Queen Anne, and Neoclassical styles, while the construction materials are primarily brick with occasional frame structures.

The Ashtabula Harbour Commercial District was designated in 1975 and listed on the National Register of Historic Places at the same time, qualifying both because of its historically significant architecture and because of its place in area history; it gained this designation largely because it retains its late nineteenth-century appearance as a flourishing harbor's business district.  Seventy-five contributing properties are located within the district's boundaries.  In 1978, the city government created the Ashtabula Harbor Historical District, a substantially larger area including numerous residential streets as well as the federally designated commercial street.  Since 2010, the city district's boundaries have extended from the river bridge to Lake Avenue and from Morton Drive along the river to the Walnut Beach Park on the lake.  City ordinance forbids exterior alterations to buildings in the federally designated district unless the owner has first completed a process of gaining approval from the city's historic preservation review board.

References

Ashtabula, Ohio
Geography of Ashtabula County, Ohio
Italianate architecture in Ohio
National Register of Historic Places in Ashtabula County, Ohio
Neoclassical architecture in Ohio
Queen Anne architecture in Ohio
Historic districts on the National Register of Historic Places in Ohio